Heek may refer to:

Heek, Germany, a municipality in western Germany.
 Heek (Netherlands), a village in the Netherlands